Brazhata is a rural locality (a village) in Osintsevskoye Rural Settlement, Kishertsky District, Perm Krai, Russia. The population was 10 as of 2010.

Geography 
Brazhata is located 38 km southeast of Ust-Kishert (the district's administrative centre) by road. Byrma is the nearest rural locality.

References 

Rural localities in Kishertsky District